The Holgate Library is a branch of the Multnomah County Library, in Portland in the U.S. state of Oregon.

Description and history 
The branch offers the Multnomah County Library catalog of two million books, periodicals and other materials. Opening on May 19, 1971, it replaced the Arleta and Lents branch libraries, though the area had been served as early as 1904 with a deposit station in a drug store in Lents. Renovated in 2000, it has  of floor space and can hold up to 30,000 volumes. The renovations included seismic upgrades, a new roof, new windows, and a solar-powered electricity back-up system, among other items. In February 2008, the branch added the county's only teen and children's librarians.

Holgate was cited, along with the Midland and Belmont branches, as one of several branches serving the Montavilla neighborhood, when that neighborhood's branch was sold by the county in 2005.

See also

 List of Carnegie libraries in Oregon

References

1971 establishments in Oregon
Foster-Powell, Portland, Oregon
Libraries established in 1971
Libraries in Portland, Oregon
Multnomah County Library